Cabaret Dancer is a 1986 Indian Malayalam film, directed by N. Sankaran Nair and produced by S. Kumar. The film stars Anuradha, M. G. Soman, Santhosh and Sathaar in the lead roles. The film has musical score by Shyam.

Cast
Anuradha
M. G. Soman
Santhosh
Sathaar
Babitha
Balan K. Nair
Janardanan
Lalithasree

References

External links
 

1986 films
1980s Malayalam-language films